The 1923 Saint Louis Billikens football team was an American football team that represented Saint Louis University of Missouri during the 1923 college football season.  Under the coaching of Dan J. Savage, the Billikens compiled a 5–3–1 record and outscored their opponents, 150 to 97.  Notable games included a scoreless tie with the  Ole Miss, a 40–0 loss to West Virginia, and a 13–0 loss to Notre Dame.

Schedule

Freshman team schedule

References

St. Louis
Saint Louis Football